Sergey Georgiyevich Lim (born 26 November 1987, Almaty) is a Kazakhstani judoka. At the 2012 Summer Olympics he competed in the Men's 66 kg, but was narrowly defeated in the third round by Masashi Ebinuma, who won with a left-handed “seoi nage” shoulder throw with 58 seconds left in the golden score period.

He won the 2013 IJF World Masters in Tyumen.

References

External links
 
 
 

Kazakhstani male judoka
Living people
Olympic judoka of Kazakhstan
Judoka at the 2012 Summer Olympics
Kazakhstani people of Korean descent
1987 births
People from Almaty
21st-century Kazakhstani people